Don Hany (born 18 September 1975) is an Australian actor. He is best known for his role in the series White Collar Blue, Dr. Chris Havel in Offspring, and the leading role of Zane Malik in the SBS series East West 101. He is also known for starring in the film The Last Confession of Alexander Pearce.

Early life
Born to an Iraqi father, Tewfiq and a Hungarian mother, Csilla; his mother is a doctor of economics and his father is a classically-trained pianist and restaurateur. His parents met in Budapest in the 1960s. Csilla rejected the communist doctrine of her native country and Tewfiq spurned the Islamic beliefs of his upbringing. Hany attended high school in the Netherlands for one year as an exchange student, and later completed a degree in Dramatic Arts at the University of Western Sydney Nepean.

Career
In 1998, Hany began his television career, starring in the soapie Breakers. In 2000, he had a small role in Water Rats. In 2002, he had a role in the tele-movie Heroes' Mountain and in the police drama White Collar Blue.

He later moved to Los Angeles to complete shooting for the film Winning the Peace, for which he won Best Actor at Method Fest in 2005.

In 2006, he returned to Australia to work on the film Lucky Miles which went on to win the audience award for Best Film at the Sydney Film Festival.

In 2007, Hany starred in the mini-series of East West 101 for SBS television, in which he played the lead role of Zane Malik. In 2008, he had a small role in Underbelly as Nik Radev.

In 2009, Hany had a busy year, starring in the mini-series False Witness, ABC1's Dirt Game, and returning to East West 101 for the second season.

In 2010, he joined the main cast of the Foxtel drama Tangle, playing politician Spiros Georgiades. He also joined Channel Ten's drama Offspring, in the role of paediatrician Chris Havel.

In 2011, Hany starred in the third and final season of East West 101. Hany also starred in the Nine Network movie premiere of Tell Them Lucifer Was Here, reprising his role from Underbelly, Nik Radev. In 2012, he was cast in two telemovies, Jack Irish: Bad Debts and Jack Irish: Black Tide, (based on the books Bad Debts and Black Tide by Peter Temple), which aired on the ABC.

In 2013, Hany took the lead role of Sam Callaghan in the HBO Asia production Serangoon Road. The following year, Hany appeared in The Broken Shore, a telemovie which aired on the ABC. He also stars in the mini-series Devil's Playground. He also had the lead role in the film Healing.

Hany played Jesse Shane in the only season of the 2016 television drama Heartbeat. In 2019, Hany played Australian Prime Minister Ewan Garrety in the second season of the political thriller Secret City. The following year, Hany took over the role of Pierce Greyson in Neighbours from Tim Robards.

Personal life
Don has a twin, Roger Hany, a London-based musician. They both attended primary school and high school on the Central Coast of New South Wales.

Hany married actress Alin Sumarwata in 2011. The couple have two daughters.

He is an agnostic atheist.

Film and television appearances

Film
 Ali's Wedding (2016)
 Healing (2014)
 Tell Them Lucifer Was Here as Nik "The Russian" Radev (2011)
 The Last Confession of Alexander Pearce (2008)
 Lucky Miles (2007)
 Sleep in Heavenly Peace (2007)
 The TV Set (2006)
 California King (2006)
 Big Top (2006)
 Winning the Peace (2004)

Television
 Neighbours (2020, 2021; 26 episodes)
 Secret City (2019)
 Bad Mothers (2019–present)
 Strike Back (2017–2018)
 Janet King (2017)
 Heartbeat (2016)
 Serangoon Road (2013)
 The Broken Shore (2013)
 Rake (2012)
 Tangle (2010–2012)
 Offspring (2010 main cast, 2011 special guest star)
 Legend of the Seeker (2009)
 Chandon Pictures (2009)
 False Witness (2009)
 Dirt Game (2009)
 Rush (2008, one episode)
 Underbelly (2008)
 East West 101 (2007–2011)
 White Collar Blue (2002)
 Heroes' Mountain (2002)
 Flat Chat (2001)
 Water Rats (2000, one episode)
 The Monster (1999)
 Breakers (1998)

Awards and nominations

References

External links

 

1975 births
Australian agnostics
Australian atheists
Australian expatriates in the Netherlands
Australian male film actors
Australian male soap opera actors
Australian people of Hungarian descent
Australian people of Iraqi descent
Living people
Logie Award winners
Male actors from Sydney
Western Sydney University alumni
20th-century Australian male actors
21st-century Australian male actors